Richardson Green (born 23 June 1961), known professionally as Redd Pepper, is a Barbadian-British voice actor. With his unusually deep voice and vocal style similar to that of Don LaFontaine, he is known for his work on movie trailers.

Early life
Pepper was born Richardson Green in Barbados on 23 June 1961, and moved to London as a child. He has six sisters and three brothers. He attended Sedgehill School in the Lewisham area of London. His first job was at a McDonald's, after which he spent six months as a firefighter. He then became a train driver on the London Underground. He later claimed to have gotten bored very easily during this job, and would prank passengers by stopping the train between stations, turning off the lights, and talking over the loudspeakers: "I used to say stuff like: 'This is your driver speaking... or is it?' in a really spooky voice."

Career
In 1996, a television executive was a passenger on a London Underground train being driven by Pepper; upon hearing his voice over the loudspeakers, the man gave Pepper his business card and asked Pepper to call him. This led to numerous jobs providing voiceovers for TV channels and adverts, and he began voicing film trailers soon after, with his first being Space Jam. He also voiced Mike LeRoi/Shadow Man in the video game Shadow Man.

Pepper came to prominence when he was mistaken for Hollywood voice artist Don LaFontaine following his voice work on the trailers for Armageddon and Independence Day. He has also appeared onstage as an actor, having acted in an Edinburgh Festival production of Jeffrey Archer's Prison Diaries. On 24 December 2010, he appeared on a celebrity edition of the BBC quiz show Eggheads. When asked if he missed being a train driver, he responded, "I make £3,000 to £4,000 per movie trailer. What do you think?"

In October 2015, Pepper replaced Peter Dickson as the voiceover of British reality show The X Factor. However, he was only present as a voiceover at Judges' Houses, as Dickson returned at the end of the month. In April 2017, he served as announcer during Bradley Walsh's week of hosting The Nightly Show.

Personal life
Redd is a supporter of football club Aston Villa F.C.

Filmography

Film trailers

Film

Television

Video games

See also
 Don LaFontaine
 Art Gilmore

References

External links
Artist profile from the British Film Institute

Artist profile from Harvey Voices

1961 births
Living people
20th-century English male actors
21st-century English male actors
Barbadian emigrants to England
Black British male actors
English male film actors
English male radio actors
English male stage actors
English male television actors
English male video game actors
English male voice actors
Male actors from London
People from Lewisham